Juhani Kari Kalervo Avellan ( in Riihimäki –  in Helsinki) was a Finnish male weightlifter, who competed in the light heavyweight class and represented Finland at international competitions. He won the bronze medal at the 1975 World Weightlifting Championships in the 82.5 kg category. He participated at the 1972 Summer Olympics in the 82.5 kg event, at the 1976 Summer Olympics in the 82.5 kg event and at the 1980 Summer Olympics in the 82.5 kg event. He won the bronze medal at the 1975 European Championships in the Light-Heavyweight class (350.0 kg). He set three light-heavyweight world records in 1970-71 – one in the snatch and one in the clean & jerk.

References

External links
 

1945 births
Finnish male weightlifters
World Weightlifting Championships medalists
People from Riihimäki
Olympic weightlifters of Finland
Weightlifters at the 1972 Summer Olympics
Weightlifters at the 1976 Summer Olympics
Weightlifters at the 1980 Summer Olympics
World record setters in weightlifting
2004 deaths
Sportspeople from Kanta-Häme
20th-century Finnish people
21st-century Finnish people